Patrick Joseph McGoohan (March 19, 1928 – January 13, 2009) was an Irish-American actor, director, screenwriter, and producer of film and television. 

Born in the United States to Irish emigrant parents, he was raised in Ireland and England. He began his career in England  in the 1950s and rose to prominence for his role as secret agent John Drake in the ITC espionage programme Danger Man (1960–1968). He then produced and created The Prisoner (1967–1968), a surrealistic television series in which he starred as Number Six, an unnamed British intelligence agent who is abducted and imprisoned in a mysterious coastal village. Beginning in the 1970s, McGoohan maintained a long-running association with Columbo, writing, directing, producing and appearing in several episodes. His notable film roles include Dr. Paul Ruth in Scanners (1981) and King Edward I in Braveheart (1995). He was a BAFTA Award and two-time Primetime Emmy Award winner.

Early life
Patrick Joseph McGoohan was born in the Astoria neighbourhood of New York City's Queens borough on March 19, 1928, the son of Irish Catholic, immigrant parents Rose (née Fitzpatrick) and Thomas McGoohan. Shortly after he was born, the family moved back to Ireland, where they lived in the Mullaghmore area of Carrigallen in the south-east of County Leitrim. 

Seven years later, they moved to England and settled in Sheffield. McGoohan attended St Marie's School, then St Vincent's School, and De La Salle College, all in Sheffield. During World War II, he was evacuated to Loughborough, where he attended Ratcliffe College at the same time as future actor Ian Bannen. McGoohan excelled in mathematics and boxing, and left school at the age of 16 to return to Sheffield, where he worked as a chicken farmer, bank clerk, and lorry driver before getting a job as a stage manager at Sheffield Repertory Theatre. When one of the actors became ill, McGoohan stood in for him, which launched his acting career.

Career

Early career
In 1955, McGoohan starred in a West End stage production of Serious Charge, as a Church of England vicar accused of being homosexual. 

Orson Welles was so impressed by McGoohan's stage presence ("intimidated", Welles would later say) that he cast him as Starbuck in his York theatre production of Moby Dick—Rehearsed. Welles said in 1969 that he believed McGoohan "would now be, I think, one of the big actors of our generation if TV hadn't grabbed him. He can still make it. He was tremendous as Starbuck", and "with all the required attributes, looks, intensity, unquestionable acting ability and a twinkle in his eye."

McGoohan's first television appearance was as Charles Stewart Parnell in "The Fall of Parnell" for You Are There (1954). He had an uncredited role in The Dam Busters (1955), standing guard outside the briefing room. He delivered the line, "Sorry, old boy, it's secret—you can't go in. Now, c'mon, hop it!", which was cut from some prints of the movie.

He also had small roles in Passage Home (1955), The Dark Avenger (1955) and I Am a Camera (1955). He could also be seen in Zarak (1956) for Warwick Films. On TV he was in "Margin for Error" in Terminus (1955), guest starred on The Adventures of Sir Lancelot and Assignment Foreign Legion, and The Adventures of Aggie. He played the lead in "The Makepeace Story" for BBC Sunday Night Theatre (1955). He also appeared in Welles' film of Moby Dick Rehearsed.

He did Ring for Catty on stage in 1956.

Rank Organisation
While working as a stand-in during screen tests, McGoohan was signed to a contract with the Rank Organisation. They put him in mostly villainous parts: High Tide at Noon (1957), directed by Philip Leacock; Hell Drivers (1957), directed by Cy Endfield, as a violent bully; and the steamy potboiler The Gypsy and the Gentleman (1958), directed by Joseph Losey.

He had good roles on TV in anthology series such as Television Playwright, Folio, Armchair Theatre, ITV Play of the Week and ITV Television Playhouse. He was given a leading role in Nor the Moon by Night (1958), shot in South Africa. After some clashes with the management, the contract was dissolved. He then did some TV work, winning a BAFTA in 1960.

His favourite part for the stage was the lead in Ibsen's Brand, for which he received an award. He also played the role in a (still extant) BBC television production in August 1959. Michael Meyer, who translated the stage version, thought McGoohan's performance was the best and most powerful he'd ever seen. It was McGoohan's last stage appearance for 28 years.

Danger Man

Production executive Lew Grade soon approached McGoohan about a television series where he would play a spy named John Drake. Having learned from his experience at Rank, McGoohan insisted on several conditions: All the fistfights should be different; the character would always use his brain before using a gun; and—much to the executives' horror—no kissing. The show debuted in 1960 as Danger Man, a half-hour programme geared toward American audiences. It did fairly well, but not as well as hoped.

Production lasted a year and 39 episodes. After the first series was over, an interviewer asked McGoohan if he would have liked it to continue. He replied, "Perhaps, but let me tell you this: I would rather do twenty TV series than go through what I went through under that Rank contract I signed a few years ago and for which I blame no one but myself."

Post-Danger Man
McGoohan appeared in Two Living, One Dead (1961), filmed in Sweden. He starred in two films directed by Basil Dearden: All Night Long, an updating of Othello, and Life for Ruth (both 1962). He also starred in an adaptation of The Quare Fellow (1962) by Brendan Behan.

McGoohan was one of several actors considered for the role of James Bond in Dr. No. While McGoohan, a Catholic, turned down the role on moral grounds, the success of the Bond films is generally cited as the reason for Danger Man being revived. (He was later considered for the same role in Live and Let Die, but turned it down again.)

McGoohan spent some time working for Disney on The Three Lives of Thomasina (1963) and The Scarecrow of Romney Marsh (1963). An English vicar Dr. Syn (played by McGoohan) becomes a scarecrow on horseback by night to thwart King George III's taxmen.

Return of Danger Man
After he had also turned down the role of Simon Templar in The Saint, Lew Grade asked McGoohan if he wanted to give John Drake another try. This time, McGoohan had even more say about the series. Danger Man (US: Secret Agent) was resurrected in 1964 as a one-hour programme. The scripts now allowed McGoohan more range in his acting. Because of the popularity of the series, he became the highest-paid actor in the UK, and the show lasted almost three more years.

After shooting the only two episodes of Danger Man to be filmed in colour, McGoohan told Lew Grade he was going to quit for another show.

The Prisoner

In the face of McGoohan's intention to quit Danger Man, Grade asked if he would at least work on "something" for him. McGoohan gave him a run-down of what would later be called a miniseries, about a secret agent who resigns suddenly and wakes up to find himself in a prison disguised as a holiday resort. Grade asked for a budget, McGoohan had one ready, and they made a deal over a handshake early on a Saturday morning to produce The Prisoner.

In addition to being the series's star, McGoohan was its executive producer, forming Everyman Films with producer David Tomblin, and also wrote and directed several episodes, in some cases using pseudonyms. The originally commissioned seven episodes became seventeen.

The title character, the otherwise-unnamed "Number Six", spends the entire series trying to escape from a mysterious prison community called "The Village", and to learn the identity of his nemesis, Number One. The Village's administrators try just as hard to force or trick him into revealing why he resigned as a spy, which he refuses to divulge. The filming location was the Italianate village of Portmeirion in North Wales, which was featured in some episodes of Danger Man.

MGM
During production of The Prisoner, MGM cast McGoohan in an action film, Ice Station Zebra (1968), for which his performance as a tightly wound British spy drew critical praise.

After the end of The Prisoner, he presented a TV show, Journey into Darkness (1968–69). He was meant to follow it with the star part of Dirk Struan in an expensive adaptation of the James Clavell best-seller Tai-Pan but the project was cancelled before filming. Instead he made The Moonshine War (1970) for MGM.

1970s
McGoohan played James Stewart, 1st Earl of Moray in Mary, Queen of Scots (1971). He directed Richie Havens in a rock-opera version of Othello, titled Catch My Soul (1974), but disliked the experience.

McGoohan received two Emmy Awards for his work on Columbo, with his long-time friend Peter Falk. McGoohan said that his first appearance on Columbo (episode: "By Dawn's Early Light", 1974) was probably his favourite American role. He directed five Columbo episodes (including three of the four in which he appeared), one of which he also wrote and two of which he also produced. McGoohan was involved with the Columbo series in some capacity from 1974 to 2000; his daughter Catherine McGoohan appeared with him in his final episode, "Ashes to Ashes" (1998). The other two Columbo episodes in which he appeared are "Identity Crisis" (1975) and "Agenda For Murder" (1990).

As he had done early in his career with the Rank Organisation, McGoohan began to specialise in villains, appearing in A Genius, Two Partners and a Dupe (1975), Silver Streak (1976) and The Man in the Iron Mask (1977).

In 1977, he starred in the television series Rafferty as a retired army doctor who moves into private practice.

He had the lead in a Canadian film, Kings and Desperate Men; then had support parts in Brass Target (1978) and the Clint Eastwood film Escape from Alcatraz (1979), portraying the prison's warden.

1980s 
In 1980 he appeared in the UK TV film The Hard Way.

In 1981 he appeared in the science fiction/horror film Scanners, and in Jamaica Inn (1983) and Trespasses (1984).

In 1985 he appeared on Broadway for his only production there, starring opposite Rosemary Harris in Hugh Whitemore's Pack of Lies, in which he played another British spy. He was nominated for a Drama Desk Award as Best Actor for his performance.

On screen he could be seen in Baby: Secret of the Lost Legend (1985), Of Pure Blood (1986) and an episode of Murder, She Wrote.

1990s
McGoohan starred in The Best of Friends (1991) for Channel 4, which told the story of the unlikely friendship between a museum curator, a nun and a playwright. McGoohan played George Bernard Shaw alongside Sir John Gielgud as Sydney Cockerell and Dame Wendy Hiller as Sister Laurentia McLachlan. In the United States, the drama was shown by PBS as part of Masterpiece Theatre.

Also in this period he featured as King Edward I in Braveheart (1995), which won five Academy Awards. It seemed to revitalise McGoohan's career: he was then seen as Judge Omar Noose in A Time to Kill (1996) and in The Phantom (also 1996), a cinema adaptation of the comic strip.

2000s
In 2000, he reprised his role as Number Six in an episode of The Simpsons, "The Computer Wore Menace Shoes". In it, Homer Simpson concocts a news story to make his website more popular, and he wakes up in a prison disguised as a holiday resort. Dubbed Number Five, he meets Number Six, and later betrays him and escapes with his boat; referencing his numerous attempts to escape on a raft in The Prisoner, Number Six splutters "That's the third time that's happened!"

McGoohan's last film role was as the voice of Billy Bones in the animated film Treasure Planet, released in 2002. That same year, he received the Prometheus Hall of Fame Award for The Prisoner.

McGoohan's name was linked to several aborted attempts at producing a new film version of The Prisoner. In 2002, Simon West was signed to direct a version of the story. McGoohan was listed as executive producer for the film, which never came to fruition. Later, Christopher Nolan was proposed as director for a film version. However, the source material remained difficult and elusive to adapt into a feature film. McGoohan was not involved in the project that was ultimately completed. A reimagining of the series was filmed for the AMC network in late 2008, with its broadcast taking place during November 2009.

Personal life
McGoohan married actress Joan Drummond on May 19, 1951. They had three children including Catherine McGoohan. 

For most of the 1960s they lived in a secluded detached house on the Ridgeway, Mill Hill, London. They settled in the Pacific Palisades district of Los Angeles in the mid-1970s.

Death
Following a brief illness, McGoohan died at Saint John's Health Center in Santa Monica, California, on January 13, 2009; he was 80 years old.

A biography of McGoohan was published in 2007 by Tomahawk Press, and another followed in 2011 by Supernova Books.

Filmography

Awards
 1960: BAFTA TV Award for Best Actor – Won
 1975: Primetime Emmy Award for Outstanding Guest Actor in a Drama Series (for Columbo: By Dawn's Early Light) – Won
 1990: Primetime Emmy Award for Outstanding Guest Actor in a Drama Series (for Columbo: Agenda for Murder) – Won

References

External links

 
 
 
 

1928 births
2009 deaths
20th-century Irish male actors
20th-century Roman Catholics
21st-century Roman Catholics
21st-century Irish male actors
American people of Irish descent
Television producers from California
Best Actor BAFTA Award (television) winners
Catholics from New York (state)
Irish emigrants to the United Kingdom
Irish male film actors
Irish male stage actors
Irish male television actors
Irish male voice actors
Male actors from Los Angeles
Male actors from Yorkshire
Male Spaghetti Western actors
People educated at Ratcliffe College
People from Astoria, Queens
People from County Leitrim
People from Pacific Palisades, California
People from Sheffield
People educated at All Saints Catholic High School, Sheffield
Primetime Emmy Award winners
Irish people of American descent
Screenwriters from New York (state)
Television producers from New York City
Screenwriters from California